Irajá Damiani Pinto (July 3, 1919 – June 21, 2014), was a Brazilian paleontologist and professor at the Federal University of Rio Grande do Sul (UFRGS in Portuguese), a member of the Brazilian Academy of Sciences, and a two time president of the Brazilian Geological Society.

Biography
Irajá Damiani Pinto was born in Porto Alegre, Rio Grande do Sul, Brazil, on July 3, 1919 

He studied Ginásio Nossa Senhora do Rosário. Attended the 2nd grade at Colégio Universitário Estadual Julio de Castilhos. In 1942, he began his studies of Natural History in the Faculty of Philosophy of the then University of Porto Alegre. He graduated BA in 1944. In 1945, even as a student in the undergraduate course, was hired as Assistant Chair of Geology and Paleontology. That year he participated in his first scientific excursion led by Dr. Llewellyn Ivor Price, who contributed much to his scientific orientation. In 1945 he carried out the DNPM, in Rio de Janeiro, with Dr. Paul Ericksen de Oliveira and directed by Dr. Llewellyn Ivor Price, and began the library of Geology and Paleontology at the University. In 1957 he helped create the course in geology of UFRGS, one of the first in Brazil.

The genus of cynodont Irajatherium is in his honor, in addition to the Museum of Paleontology Irajá Damiani Pinto.

References 

 Book: Os Fascinantes Caminhos da Paleontologia. Author : Antônio Isaia. Publisher Pallotti. (Portuguese)
 Book: "Cronologia Histórica de Santa Maria e do extinto município de São Martinho." 1787-1933. Vol I. Author: Romeu Beltrão, Publisher Pallotti, 1958. (Portuguese)

Brazilian paleontologists
People from Porto Alegre
Recipients of the Great Cross of the National Order of Scientific Merit (Brazil)
1919 births
2014 deaths
Academic staff of the Federal University of Rio Grande do Sul